Eduard Cuypers (18 April 1859 Roermond – 1 June 1927, The Hague) was a Dutch architect. He worked in Amsterdam and the Dutch East Indies.

Biography
Cuypers was trained in the architectural practice of his uncle Pierre Cuypers, the country's major neo-Gothic architect. In 1881 set up his own office in Amsterdam. His contacts with businessmen earned him commissions for offices, shops, and houses. Unlike his uncle, Cuypers' work was closely related to Neo-renaissance and Jugendstil. Although he designed several churches, Eduard did not confine himself solely to ecclesiastical architecture. Instead, he designed a few dozen railway stations, which were mostly built in the north of the country, several hospitals, and more than hundred housing projects in the Netherlands.

Eduard Cuypers and his employees also designed pieces of furniture and other objects for interiors, such as lamps. In 1905 Cuypers published Het Huis, Oud & Nieuw (The House, Old and New), a magazine for interior design that was published until he died in 1927. He was buried at Zorgvlied cemetery.

The office of Eduard Cuypers is considered to be the origin of the Amsterdam School because the leaders of this style, Michel de Klerk, Johan van der Mey, and Piet Kramer, were trained there. Berend Tobia Boeyinga, one of the most important followers of the Amsterdam school, also worked for Cuypers, as did prominent Indonesian architect Liem Bwan Tjie. After Cuypers died in 1927, his office was continued by others. The current name in the Netherlands is A/D Amstel Architects in Amsterdam.

Dutch East Indies
Cuypers opened an agency in the Dutch East Indies to work on major projects such as the headquarters and branch office of De Javasche Bank in Indonesia. With Marius J. Hulswit and Arthur Fermont, Cuypers opened the largest architectural agency in the East Indies, then called Hulswit-Fermont, Batavia, and Ed.Cuypers, Amsterdam. After Cuypers died in 1927, his office in Batavia/Jakarta was continued by others under the name Fermont-Cuypers until 1957.

Works

Javasche Bank now Museum Bank Indonesia, Jakarta (with Hulswit,1913) Frontbuilding rebuilt in 1936-1937.
Javasche Bank now Bank Indonesia, Medan (1909)

Books
'Landmarks from a bygone era'. Life and work of Eduard Cuypers in the former Dutch East Indies, now Indonesia, Obbe H. Norbruis (2020) LM Publishers.

References

Exteran link

1859 births
1927 deaths
Dutch architects
Dutch ecclesiastical architects
People from Roermond
Art Nouveau architects